Sergei Efimovich Gribov (17 July 1895 – 29 July 1938) was a Soviet komkor (corps commander). He fought in the Imperial Russian Army during World War I before going over to the Bolsheviks during the subsequent civil war. He was a recipient of the Order of the Red Banner. He commanded forces in the North Caucasus region. During the Great Purge, he was arrested on 28 January 1938 and later executed. After the death of Joseph Stalin, he was rehabilitated in 1956.

Bibliography
 
 Селиванов П. А. Комкор Сергей Грибов. Минск, 1972.
 Советская военная энциклопедия в 8-ми томах, том 3.

Sources
 Composition of the Military Council of the People's Commissariat of Defense of the USSR (February 1936)
 Biographies at hrono.ru
 Repression in the Red Army

1895 births
1938 deaths
Russian military personnel of World War I
Soviet military personnel of the Russian Civil War
Soviet komkors
Recipients of the Order of the Red Banner
Great Purge victims from Russia
People executed by the Soviet Union
Soviet rehabilitations